An all-time medal table for all Paralympic Games from 1960 to 2020. The International Paralympic Committee does not publish all-time tables, and publishes unofficial tables only per single Games. This table was thus compiled by adding up single entries from the IPC database. This medal table also includes the medals won on the 1992 Summer Paralympics for Intellectualy Disabled, held in Madrid, which also organized by the International Coordination Committee (ICC) and same Organizing Committee (COOB'92) that made the gestion of the 1992 Summer Paralympics held in Barcelona and also part of same event. But the results are not on the International Paralympic Committee 's (IPC) database. 

The results are attributed to the IPC country code as currently displayed by the IPC database. Usually, a single code corresponds to a single National Paralympic Committee (NPC). When different codes are displayed for different years, medal counts are combined in the case of a simple change of IPC code (such as from RHO to ZIM for Zimbabwe) or simple change of country name (such as from Ceylon to Sri Lanka). As the medals are attributed to each NPC, not all totals include medals won by athletes from that country for another NPC, such as before independence of that country (see individual footnotes for special cases such as combined teams). Names in italic are national entities that no longer exist.


Medal table
The table is pre-sorted by the name of each Paralympic Committee, but can be displayed as sorted by any other column, such as the total number of gold medals or total number of overall medals. To sort by gold, silver, and then bronze (as used unofficially by the IPC and by most broadcasters outside the US) sort first by the bronze column, then the silver, and then the gold.
Medal totals in this table are current as of the 2022 Winter Paralympics in Beijing.

NPCs without medals
After the 2020 Summer Paralympics in Tokyo, 66 of the current 182 National Paralympic Committees have yet to win a Paralympic medal. Two historic National Paralympic Committees are also included in this list.

Complete ranked medals

Summer Paralympic (1960–2020)

Winter Paralympics (1976–2022)

Combined total (1960–2022)

See also
All-time Olympic Games medal table
All-time Youth Olympic Games medal table
Lists of Paralympic medalists
List of multiple Paralympic gold medalists
List of Paralympic teams by medals won

Notes

References

External links
 All-Time Medal-Tally (Summer Paralympics) as of Beijing 2008, International Paralympic Committee (IPC) — Dead link.

Medal tables at multi-sport events
Paralympic Games
All-time
Paralympics-related lists